Tytthoscincus perhentianensis, the Perhentian Island forest skink, is a species of skink. It is endemic to Perhentian Islands in Malaysia.

References

perhentianensis
Endemic fauna of Malaysia
Reptiles of Malaysia
Reptiles described in 2009
Taxa named by Larry Lee Grismer